Aeroglen is a coastal suburb of Cairns in the Cairns Region, Queensland, Australia.

It is approximately 5 kilometers (3 miles) north of the Cairns City centre.

Geography

The suburb is bounded to the north by the Barron River, to the east by the Coral Sea, to the south by Lily Creek, and to the west loosely by the Captain Cook Highway but with one small pocket of housing to the west of the highway.

Aeroglen is located on a slope at the foot of the Mount Whitfield Conservation Park.

The Captain Cook Highway enters the suburb from the south (Cairns North) and exits to the north-west (Barron / Machans Beach).

The Tablelands railway line also enters the suburb from the south (Cairns North), immediately west of the highway and exits to the west (Stratford). The suburb was served by the Aeroglen railway station, but it is now abandoned.

Most of the suburb is taken up by the Cairns International Airport which lies between the highway and the Coral Sea.

History 
Aeroglen is situated in the Yidinji traditional Aboriginal country.

Aeroglen was named prior to 1939 because of the proximity to the historical aerodrome, which was purchased by the Australian Government in 1937. The area was previously known as Quarry Siding.

The most common response for religion in Aeroglen was No Religion at 38.2% of the population.

Education 
There are no schools in Aeroglen. The nearest government primary schools are Edge Hill State School in Edge Hill to the south-west, Freshwater State School in Freshwater to the west, and Machans Beach State School in neighbouring Machans Beach to the north. The nearest secondary school is Cairns State High School in neighbouring Cairns North to the south.

References

External links

Aeroglen Brochure Cairns Regional Council

Suburbs of Cairns